MOEA may refer to:
 Molybdopterin molybdotransferase
 Ministry of Economic Affairs (Republic of China)
 Ministry of External Affairs (India)
 MOEA Framework